Hu Yulan also known as Hu Yu-lan was a female international table tennis player from China.

Table tennis career
From 1972 to 1975 she won several medals in singles, doubles, and team events in the Asian Table Tennis Championships and in the World Table Tennis Championships.

The three World Championship medals  included two gold medals in the singles at the 1973 World Table Tennis Championships and team event at the 1975 World Table Tennis Championships.

See also
 List of table tennis players
 List of World Table Tennis Championships medalists

References

1945 births
2021 deaths
Chinese female table tennis players
Asian Games medalists in table tennis
Table tennis players at the 1974 Asian Games
Medalists at the 1974 Asian Games
Asian Games gold medalists for China
Asian Games bronze medalists for China
People from Jinzhou
Table tennis players from Liaoning